Neo-Georgian may refer to:

 A revival of Georgian architecture
 Colonial Revival architecture, in North America
 Neo-Georgian style (Great Britain), a revival of Georgian architecture in the United Kingdom in the 20th century